94 nations participated in qualifying for the 2007 Rugby World Cup. The 86 teams taking part in regional qualifiers together with the 8 teams which have qualified automatically brings to 94 the total number of teams participating in the 2007 Rugby World Cup.

Africa
(15 teams, 2.25 places)
 - (Failed to advance past Africa, Round 1a)
 - (Failed to advance past Africa, Round 1a)
  - (Failed to advance past Africa, Round 2)
  - (Failed to advance past Africa, Round 2)
 - (Failed to advance past Africa, Round 1b)
 - (Failed to advance past Repechage 1, Round 1)
 - (Qualified as Africa 1)
 - (Failed to advance past Africa, Round 1a)
 - (Failed to advance past Africa, Round 1b)
 - (Automatic qualifier)
 - (Failed to advance past Africa, Round 1a)
 - (Failed to advance past Africa, Round 2)
 - (Failed to advance past Africa, Round 2)
 - (Failed to advance past Africa, Round 1a Playoff)
 - (Failed to advance past Africa, Round 1b Playoff)

Americas
(19 teams, 3.5 places)
 - (Qualified as Americas 1)
 - (Failed to advance past Americas, Round 1a)
 - (Failed to advance past Americas, Round 3b)
 - (Failed to advance past Americas, Round 1a)
 - (Failed to advance past Americas, Round 2)
 - (Qualified as Americas 2)
 - (Failed to advance past Americas, Round 1a)
 - (Failed to advance past Americas, Round 3a)
 - (Failed to advance past Americas, Round 1b)
 - (Failed to advance past Americas, Round 1a)
 - (Failed to advance past Americas, Round 1a)
 - (Failed to advance past Americas, Round 2)
 - (Failed to advance past Americas, Round 1b)
 - (Failed to advance past Americas, Round 1a)
 - (Failed to qualify for Americas, Round 1a)
 - (Failed to advance past Americas, Round 1a)
 - (Qualified as Americas 3)
 - (Failed to advance past Repechage 1, Round 2)
 - (Failed to advance past Americas, Round 1b)

Asia
(13 teams, 1.5 places)
 - (Failed to advance beyond Asia, Round 2)
 - (Failed to advance beyond Asia, Round 1a)
 - (Failed to advance beyond Asia, Round 1a)
 - (Failed to advance beyond Asia, Round 1a)
 - (Failed to advance beyond Asia, Round 3)
 - (Failed to advance beyond Asia, Round 1a)
 - (Qualified as Asia 1)
 - (Failed to advance beyond Repechage 2)
 - (Failed to advance beyond Asia, Round 1b)
 - (Failed to advance beyond Asia, Round 1a)
 - (Failed to advance beyond Asia, Round 1a)
 - (Failed to advance beyond Asia, Round 2)
 - (Failed to advance beyond Asia, Round 1a)

Europe
(36 teams, 8.25 places)
 - (Failed to advance past Europe, Round 3)
 - (Failed to advance past Europe, Round 2)
 - (Failed to advance past Europe, Round 3)
 - (Failed to advance past Europe, Round 1)
 - (Failed to advance past Europe, Round 2)
 - (Failed to advance past Europe, Round 3)
 - (Failed to advance past Europe, Round 4)
 - (Failed to advance past Europe, Round 2 Playoff)
 - (Automatic qualifier and champions) 
 - (Failed to advance past Europe, Round 1)
 - (Automatic qualifier and host) 
 - (Failed to advance past Europe, Round 3 Playoff)
 - (Qualified as Europe 3)
 - (Failed to advance past Europe, Round 2)
 - (Automatic qualifier) 
 - (Failed to advance past Europe, Round 1)
 - (Qualified as Europe 1)
 - (Failed to advance past Europe, Round 2)
 - (Failed to advance past Europe, Round 2)
 - (Failed to advance past Europe, Round 2)
 - (Failed to advance past Europe, Round 3)
 - (Failed to advance past Europe, Round 3)
 - (Failed to advance past Europe, Round 3)
 - (Failed to advance past Europe, Round 1)
 - (Failed to advance past Europe, Round 3)
 - (Qualified as Repechage 1)
 - (Qualified as Europe 2)
 - (Failed to advance past Europe, Round 5)
 - (Automatic qualifier) 
 - (Failed to advance past Europe, Round 3)
 - (Failed to advance past Europe, Round 2)
 - (Failed to advance past Europe, Round 5)
 - (Failed to advance past Europe, Round 2 Playoff)
 - (Failed to advance past Europe, Round 2)
 - (Failed to advance past Europe, Round 4)
 - (Automatic qualifier)

Oceania
(11 teams, 4.5 places)
 - (Automatic qualifier) 
 - (Failed to advance beyond Oceania, Round 4)
 - (Qualified as Oceania 2)
 - (Failed to advance beyond Oceania, Round 2)
 - (Automatic qualifier) 
 - (Failed to advance beyond Oceania, Round 1a)
 - (Qualified as Oceania 1)
 - (Failed to advance beyond Oceania, Round 1a)
 - (Failed to advance beyond Oceania, Round 1a)
 - (Qualified as Repechage 2)
 - (Failed to advance beyond Oceania, Round 1a)

See also
Rugby World Cup
2007 Rugby World Cup
2007 Rugby World Cup qualifying

2007 Rugby World Cup qualification
World Cup 2007